Nanarchaea is a genus of Australian shield spiders that was first described by Michael Gordon Rix in 2006.  it contains only two species, found in Tasmania, Victoria, New South Wales, and Queensland: N. binnaburra and N. bryophila.

See also
 List of Malkaridae species

References

Araneomorphae genera
Malkaridae
Spiders of Australia